"Belonging to Someone" is a popular song, written by Al Hoffman and Dick Manning and published in 1958.

It was popularized by Patti Page in 1958. The Page recording was released by Mercury Records as catalog number 71247. It first reached the Billboard magazine charts on February 10, 1958. On the Disk Jockey chart, it peaked at #13; on the Best Seller chart, at #32; on the composite chart of the top 100 songs, it reached #34.

1958 songs
Songs written by Al Hoffman
Songs written by Dick Manning